Paige Hennekam (born August 2, 2000), who goes by the name Paige Layle on social media, is a Canadian Autism and ADHD acceptance activist, YouTuber and TikToker.

Career

Activism 
After initially downloading TikTok "as a joke", Hennekam started making videos on the platform in March 2020. She was inspired to make videos after hearing an audio clip on TikTok that made fun of autistic people. Layle created a four part video series on autism in girls to address common misconceptions about the disorder. In 2020 and 2021, Layle and other members of the autism community weighed in on controversy surrounding Sia's film Music.

In 2021, Layle and other autism advocates criticized Color The Spectrum: A Livestream To Support the Autism Community, a fundraiser launched by Mark Rober in support of NEXT for Autism. Layle critiqued NEXT for funding Autism Speaks and attempting to cure autism. To counter Color the Spectrum, Layle and other advocates planned to host a fundraising livestream on the same date at the same time to raise money for the Autistic Self Advocacy Network. The livestream was later cancelled due to allegations that ASAN plagiarized work from Indigenous creator Autistic, Typing.

Hennekam has over 55 million likes and 2.4 million subscribers on TikTok. She also has over 131,000 followers on Instagram.

Other 
In 2022, Hennekam was a performer for the audiobook of Wendy Walker's American Girl, produced by Audible.

Personal life 
At age 15, Hennekam attempted suicide. Shortly thereafter, she was diagnosed with autism. Hennekam also has obsessive-compulsive disorder and attention deficit hyperactivity disorder. She is pansexual and uses she and they pronouns.

Hennekam lives in Kawartha Lakes, Ontario and works as a lash technician.

References 

Canadian TikTokers
People from Kawartha Lakes
People on the autism spectrum
People with obsessive–compulsive disorder
Autism activists
21st-century Canadian LGBT people
Pansexual women
Living people
2000 births
YouTube channels launched in 2015